Litton is a surname. Notable people with the surname include:

 Abram Litton (19th century), American professor of chemistry
 Andrew Litton (born 1959), American orchestral conductor
 Ashley Litton (born 1983), American beauty queen
 Charles Litton Sr. (1904–1972), American engineer and inventor
 Chase Litton (born 1995), American football player
 Drew Litton (born 1958), American cartoonist
 Edward Litton (1787–1870), Irish Member of Parliament (MP) for Coleraine 1837–1843
 Edward Falconer Litton (1827–1890), Irish Member of Parliament for Tyrone 1880–1841
 Greg Litton (born 1964), American baseball player
 Henry Litton (born 1934), Hong Kong judge
 James Litton, American choral conductor
 Jerry Litton (1937–1976), American politician
 Marie Litton, stage name of Mary Jessie Lowe (1847–1884), English actress and theatre manager
 Martin Litton (environmentalist) (1917–2014), American conservationist
 Martin Litton (pianist) (born 1957), British jazz pianist
 Ray Litton (1931–2014), American baseball player, city manager and mayor

See also
 Lytton (surname)